The Tour of Bulgaria is an annual international professional bicycle race held in Bulgaria that was first staged on 21 August 1924. It is part of UCI Europe Tour and is category 2.2. The race covers about 1,500 kilometres and lasts two weeks. As of 2017, 66 editions were held. The longest length of the race was in 1949 – 1905 km. The course changes every year, but the race has always started in Sofia.

In the race, cyclists from more than 40 countries have been competing. During the Cold War, the Tour of Bulgaria was one of the most prestigious cycling races in Europe, drawing skilled cyclists from the countries that traditionally produce strong racers, such as Italy, France and Netherlands. Although after the changes in 1989 the race lost some of its prestige for the cyclists in the peloton, nowadays it becomes more and more attractive for them. For example, in 2010 Francisco Mancebo who finished second in the 2004 Vuelta a España and fourth in the 2005 Tour de France, competed in it but only succeeded to finish third after the Bulgarian Krasimir Vasilev and Ricardo Mestre.

In 2017, the race was split into two three-day races based on geographical location.

Winners

Tour of Bulgaria

References 
Diary of Union of Bulgarian cycling, 2007

External links 

Facebook page of International Tour of Bulgaria
Website for the Tour of Bulgaria

Cycle races in Bulgaria
UCI Europe Tour races
Recurring sporting events established in 1924
1924 establishments in Bulgaria